Tako Hajo Jelgersma (October 29, 1702 in Harlingen – March 24, 1795 in Haarlem), was an 18th-century  Dutch painter.

Biography

According to the RKD-Nederlands Instituut voor Kunstgeschiedenis, Jelgersma moved to Haarlem in 1757. He was the pupil of Frans Decker and Wigerus Vitringa. He painted landscapes, portraits, and copies of old masters. His grisailles followed the manner of Jacob de Wit. His pupils were Johan Bernard Brandhoff, Johannes Petrus van Horstok, Cornelis van Noorde, Martinus van der Jagt, and Johannes Swertner. He lived to a great age.

His pupil Cornelis van Noorde made many engravings after portraits that Jelgersma made. Often these are the only surviving portraits of these people today.

References

External links

1702 births
1795 deaths
18th-century Dutch painters
18th-century Dutch male artists
Dutch male painters
People from Harlingen, Netherlands
Frisian painters